Brooke Locklear Clark (May 21, 1979 - ) is a District Court Judge for Robeson County, North Carolina since she was sworn in on August 1st, 2018. Clark is a Robeson County native born in Pembroke, NC.

She was appointed by Gov. Roy Cooper to fill the seat of Chief District Court Judge J. Stanley Carmical and worked to be the first American Indian woman appointed to the Robeson County District Court.

Early life 
Brooke Locklear Clark was born May 21, 1979, in Pembroke, North Carolina, to former Superior Court Judge Gary and Molly Locklear. She grew up as an active member of the Lumbee Tribe of North Carolina community. The legal field wasn't always in her path, as a young female Clark actually wanted to pursue medicine until she had encountered molecular biology which caused her to change directions to the study of humans, or anthropology.

Education 
In 2001, Clark graduated from the University of North Carolina at Chapel Hill with a Bachelor's Degree and continued here education here to later earn her Juris Doctor. Her experiences in undergrad led her to the legal field after multiple different networking and volunteer experiences at UNC at Chapel Hill.

Career 
Clark is also an active member of her community as well as a Bible Drill Leader at the Berea Baptist Church and her role with Friends of the Robeson County Public Library. In 2018, Clark announced her intent to file for the open seat as the District Court Judge in Robeson County, she was then appointed by Gov. Roy Cooper later that year. 

She still currently serves as the District Court Judge of Robeson County and was recently appointed to the North Carolina Task Force for Racial Equity in Criminal Justice in July 2020. She is also apart of the Family Drug Treatment Court where her experience in law helps families overcome substance abuse within the home.

References 

1979 births
Living people
Wikipedia Student Program
Robeson County, North Carolina
21st-century judges
Women judges
University of North Carolina alumni